Calvin Lewis Barton (1874 – May 10, 1939) was a one-term Republican mayor of Norwalk, Connecticut. He was the son of Lewis Barton and Caroline C. Bebee. He graduated from Cornell University in 1899 in civil engineering. He married Nina Bagley on September 19, 1908

He was president of C. L. Barton, engineers, of South Norwalk. Previously he had been an engineer with various companies, including the American Bridge Company, the Phoenix Construction Company, and the McHarg-Boston Company.

References

1874 births
1939 deaths
American civil engineers
Connecticut Republicans
Cornell University College of Engineering alumni
Mayors of Norwalk, Connecticut
Engineers from Connecticut